Agofredus, also known as Aifroy, (died 738) was a French monk and saint. His memorial is June 21.

Life
A Benedictine known throughout Normandy for his holiness, he was the brother of St. Leutfridus (Leufroy), whom he succeeded as abbot of the Benedictine monastery at La-Croix Saint-Ouen in June 738.

References

738 deaths
French Benedictines
8th-century Frankish saints
Year of birth unknown